Vexit may refer to:

Venezuela leaving the Organization of American States
A proposal for the western counties of Virginia to secede and join West Virginia